Topaz is an album by American musician Israel Nash, released on March 12, 2021, via Loose Music, Desert Folklore Music, and Soundly Music. The album, recorded in Nash's Plum Creek Sound studio in Texas, was first announced in December 2020, alongside the release of lead single "Canyonheart".

Reception

Review aggregator Metacritic gave Topaz a weighted average score of 81/100, based on 4 reviews, indicating "universal acclaim". Glide Magazines Jim Hynes called the album "less dense" than Nash's previous release Lifted, and said the album has a "meaty rock foundation with touches of psychedelia and skylark folk that fans have come to love", but "now with  soulful heft that nods to Muscle Shoals and Memphis, which in one sense, makes it a bit more tangible than his previous work. Yet it remains moody and vast, cohesive and compelling." For Americana Highways, Andrew Gulden wrote that the album "doubles down on [Nash's] expansive aura while maintaining a dreamy-folk intimacy." PopMatters Steve Horowitz wrote that "the songs capture the [Texas Hill Country's] landscape's barrenness in a manner reminiscent of 1970s Pink Floyd records or prog-rock of the 1980s where the vastness of the mind was recapitulated in the spaces between the musical notes -- in this case, in service of cosmic country rock." The New Statesman'''s Ellen Peirson-Hagger, in a review focused on the album's political lyrical content, wrote that "Nash leans into clichés of the country genre, as if towing the line of just how many of its tropes he can get away with using while he figures out his place in the culture", while expressing disappointment in saying "However, I can't help but think how much more zest these tracks would have were they more direct in their lyrical intent." Per Uncut''s Andrew Mueller, the album is "a fine racket" of "sumptuous country-soul, leaning heavily on the brass, most obviously evocative of the more ruminative records of Neil Young, or the rockier edges of Rodney Crowell", and "a languid and gently uplifting work" which is "at its best when its angriest."

Year-end lists

Track listing

Personnel 
Israel Nash - vocals, guitar, production, engineering
Adrian Quesada - electric guitar, co-production
Edward Brailiff - piano
Josh Fleischmann - drums, percussion
Scott Davis - bass
Roger Sollenberger - electric guitar
Derek Phelps - trumpet
Joe Woullard - baritone saxophone
Jason Frey - tenor saxophone
Eric Swanson - pedal steel guitar, electric guitar, harmonies
Sam Powell - piano, organ, synth
Curtis Roush - electric guitar
Ed Jarusinsky - drums, percussion
Seth Kauffman - drums, percussion, bass
Jacob Rodriguez - baritone saxophone, tenor saxophone
Rockyanne Bullwinkel - background vocals
Jenny Carson - background vocals
Taylor Torres - engineering
Matt Gerhard - engineering
Kevin Ratterman - mixing, mastering

Charts

References

2021 albums
Israel Nash albums
Country rock albums
Psychedelic music albums
Folk albums by American artists
Loose Music albums
Albums recorded in a home studio